Orphnaeus brevilabiatus is a species of centipedes in the family Oryidae.

Description
Adult specimens are typically 60-65 mm long, yellowish-orange in colour and ca. 1 mm wide at the head.

Distribution
It is a littoral myriapod that can be found throughout sublittoral zones of Indian and East Pacific countries, including Taiwan and Japan, in particular the Okinawan, Yaeyama and Miyama islands, where it is listed as a threatened local population. It has been introduced to south-west Western Australia.

Biology 
The species is one of several bioluminescent centipede genera currently known. Upon direct chemical, thermal and physical stimulation, the centipede secretes a clear, but bioluminescent slime from pores in its sternal defense glands, supposedly a form of aposematism. While several genera display this form of bioluminescence, utilising the typical oxygen-dependent luciferin-luciferase reaction, this example is noteworthy due to the low, narrow pH range of the reaction, and the relatively long period of emission.

References

External links
Case 3227. Geophilus brevilabiatus Newport, 1845 (currently Orphnaeus brevilabiatus) and Chomatobius brasilianus Humbert & Saussure, 1870 (currently O. brasilianus) (Chilopoda): proposed conservation of the specific names

brevilabiatus
Animals described in 1919
Arthropods of Asia
Centipedes of Australia
Animals described in 1845
Taxa named by George Newport